Lee County is a county located in the U.S. state of Arkansas. With its eastern border formed by the Mississippi River, it is considered to be part of the Arkansas Delta. As of the 2020 census, the population was 8,600. The county seat is Marianna.

The county was established by the state legislature on April 17, 1873, during the Reconstruction era. It was named for General Robert E. Lee, who served as General in Chief of the Armies of the Confederate States during the American Civil War. The area of the Delta was developed largely for cotton as a commodity crop before the Civil War, based on the labor of enslaved African Americans. It continued as an important crop into the 20th century, when it was worked by African-American sharecroppers and tenant farmers.

History
In the post-Reconstruction era, whites struggled to re-establish white supremacy, by violence and intimidation of black Republican Party voters in this area and throughout the South. At the turn of the century, the state legislature passed measures that effectively disenfranchised most blacks for decades. The Equal Justice Initiative reported in 2015 that the county had 15 lynchings of African Americans from 1877 to 1950, most in the decades near the turn of the 20th century. This was the third-highest of any county in the state. To escape the violence and oppression, thousands of African Americans left the state in the Great Migration to northern and western cities, especially after 1940. Mechanization of farming and industrial-scale agriculture have decreased the need for workers. The rural county has continued to lose population because of the lack of work opportunities. There has been a decrease in population every decade since 1940.

Geography

Major highways
 U.S. Highway 79
 Highway 1
 Highway 78
 Highway 121
 Highway 131
 Highway 261

Adjacent counties
St. Francis County (north)
Crittenden County (northeast)
Tunica County, Mississippi (east)
Phillips County (south)
Monroe County (west)

National protected area
 St. Francis National Forest (part)

Demographics

2020 census

As of the 2020 United States Census, there were 8,600 people, 3,206 households, and 1,994 families residing in the county.

2010 census
As of the 2010 United States Census, there were 10,424 people living in the county. 55.3% were Black or African American, 42.0% White, 0.5% Native American, 1.6% were Hispanic or Latino (of any race), 0.4% Asian, 0.7% of some other race and 1.2% of two or more races.

2000 census
As of the 2000 United States Census, there were 12,580 people, 4,182 households, and 2,960 families living in the county.  The population density was 21 people per square mile (8/km2).  There were 4,768 housing units at an average density of 8 per square mile (3/km2).  The racial makeup of the county was 57.24% Black or African American, 41.41% White, 2.19% Hispanic or Latino of any race, 0.27% Asian, 0.16% Native American, 0.52% from other races, and 0.40% from two or more races.

There were 4,182 households, out of which 31.20% had children under the age of 18 living with them, 43.20% were married couples living together, 23.10% had a female householder with no husband present, and 29.20% were non-families. 27.20% of all households were made up of individuals, and 13.80% had someone living alone who was 65 years of age or older.  The average household size was 2.59 and the average family size was 3.14.

In the county, the population was spread out, with 26.00% under the age of 18, 10.20% from 18 to 24, 28.70% from 25 to 44, 21.10% from 45 to 64, and 14.00% who were 65 years of age or older.  The median age was 35 years. For every 100 females there were 111.40 males.  For every 100 females age 18 and over, there were 118.40 males.

The median income for a household in the county was $20,510, and the median income for a family was $25,846. Males had a median income of $26,900 versus $19,505 for females. The per capita income for the county was $10,983.  About 24.70% of families and 29.90% of the population were below the poverty line, including 38.80% of those under age 18 and 27.60% of those age 65 or over.

Government and infrastructure
The East Arkansas Regional Unit of the Arkansas Department of Correction is in Lee County.

The Lee County Courthouse in located in the town of Marianna, which is the county seat.

Since World War II, Lee County has voted for the Democratic presidential candidate in all but two elections:  1948, when it voted for third-party Strom Thurmond rather than for Harry Truman, and in 1972, when formerly Democratic voters crossed party lines and voted for Republican Richard Nixon. The former comes with the caveat that Black people could not vote in the South in 1948, and the latter was the last year that white conservatives dominated county politics. Following passage and enforcement of the Voting Rights Act of 1965, newly registered African Americans began to support Democratic Party candidates. They have largely maintained this affiliation. Most whites have shifted into the Republican Party since the 1970s. Despite being a Democrat stronghold, in 2020 Donald Trump became the first Republican since 1972 (and only the second overall) to come within 5% of winning the county.

Communities

Towns
Marianna (county seat)
Aubrey
Haynes
LaGrange
Moro
Rondo

Unincorporated communities
Kokomo, Arkansas
Brickeys, Arkansas
Midway, Arkansas
Monroe, Arkansas

Townships

 Big Creek
 Council
 Fleener
 Hampton (Moro)
 Hardy
 Independence (Marianna)
 Oak Forest
 Richland (LaGrange, Rondo)
 St. Francis
 Spring Creek (Aubrey)
 Texas
 Union (Haynes)

See also

 Jones Bar-B-Q Diner, Arkansas' only James Beard Award-winning restaurant
 List of counties in Arkansas
 List of lakes in Lee County, Arkansas
 List of memorials to Robert E. Lee
 National Register of Historic Places listings in Lee County, Arkansas

References

External links
 

 
Lee County
Lee County
Lee County, Arkansas
Black Belt (U.S. region)
Majority-minority counties in Arkansas